Henry Berkeley (fl. 1414–1421) was an English politician.

He was a Member (MP) of the Parliament of England for Totnes in November 1414 and May 1421.

References

Year of birth missing
Year of death missing
English MPs November 1414
English MPs May 1421
Members of the Parliament of England (pre-1707) for Totnes